Jeffrey Chen (born July 21, 2002) is an American ice dancer. With his former skating partner, Katarina Wolfkostin, he was the 2021 U.S. junior national champion, the 2021 French JGP champion, the 2020 U.S. junior national silver medalist, and the 2020 Winter Youth Olympics bronze medalist.

Personal life 
Jeffrey Chen was born in Fremont, California, on July 21, 2002, to Taiwanese parents, Hsiu-Hui Tseng and Chih-Hsiu Chen. His older sister Karen also represents the U.S. internationally in singles. Chen enjoys hip-hop dance, gaming, and photography. He has a pet sun conure named Mango.

Career

Early career 
Chen began skating in 2010 after following his older sister Karen onto the ice. He competed in singles until the 2014–15 season and was the 2014 U.S. national juvenile pewter medalist. As a singles skater, Chen trained in Riverside, California, alongside his sister under Tammy Gambill.

Chen switched to ice dance and teamed up with Layla Karnes in the 2015–16 season. Together, they were the 2016 U.S. national juvenile ice dance champions and the 2017 U.S. national intermediate silver medalists. Chen then moved to Michigan to live with his mother, and he then changed coaches and began training with Marina Zoueva before the next season. He competed with Gianna Buckley during the 2017–18 season, winning the 2018 U.S. national novice silver medal. Chen then skated two months with Anna Lavrova during the 2018–19 season, but the partnership ended before the 2019 U.S. Championships.

2019–2020 season 
Chen began skating with Katarina Wolfkostin in 2019, and he moved to train with her coaches, Igor Shpilband and Pasquale Camerlengo, in Novi, Michigan. They placed fifth in their international debut at 2019 JGP France. Wolfkostin/Chen improved to fourth at 2019 JGP Russia after placing second in the free dance. They won the inaugural U.S. Ice Dance Final to qualify for the 2020 U.S. Championships. Wolfkostin/Chen won their first international medal at the 2019 Golden Spin of Zagreb, earning the silver medal behind Ushakova/Nekrasov of Russia.

Wolfkostin/Chen were named as the sole ice dance entrant on the U.S. team for the 2020 Winter Youth Olympics. They were fifth after the rhythm dance, before placing third in the free dance, to win the bronze medal overall behind Russians Khavronina/Cirisano and Tyutyunina/Shustitsky. Their medal was the first won by Team USA at the 2020 Winter Youth Olympics. Wolfkostin/Chen were drawn as part of Team Determination for the team event, alongside singles skaters Cha Young-hyun of South Korea and Nella Pelkonen of Finland and pairs skaters Brooke McIntosh / Brandon Toste of Canada. They placed fourth in the free dance segment to help Team Determination finish fourth after losing the tie-breaker.

Wolfkostin/Chen placed fourth in the rhythm dance and second in the free dance to win the silver medal at the 2020 U.S. Championships, behind Nguyen/Kolesnik.  Assigned to compete at their first World Junior Championships, they placed seventh.

2020–2021 season 
The season was shortened due to the COVID-19 pandemic, with domestic competitions initially changed to a virtual format, leading up to the 2021 U.S. Championships. Wolfkostin/Chen placed first in the rhythm dance and first in the free dance in both rounds of the 2020 Virtual ISP Points Challenge, and second in the free dance at the 2020 Virtual U.S. Championship Series.  Wolfkostin/Chen then competed at the 2021 U.S. Championships, after Chen was medically cleared to skate after a second opinion was obtained following a knee injury, originally thought to be an incapacitating ACL tear.  Despite the injury, they placed first in both the rhythm and free dance, earning them the gold medal for the national title.

2021–2022 season 
Returning to international competition for the first time in over a year, Wolfkostin/Chen began on the Junior Grand Prix by competing at the first French JGP of 2021, in Courchevel. They placed first in both segments, easily winning the gold medal. At their second event, 2021 JGP Slovenia, they placed third in the rhythm dance but made up ground in the free dance, placing second in that segment and placed second overall. Assigned to their first senior event just a few weeks later, Wolfkostin/Chen placed ninth at the 2021 CS Cup of Austria. Their JGP results had qualified them for the 2021–22 Junior Grand Prix Final, but it was subsequently canceled as a result of travel restrictions prompted by the Omicron variant.

Rather than seeking to defend their national junior title, Wolfkostin/Chen opted to compete as seniors at the 2022 U.S. Championships. They finished in sixth place overall, notably beating former national pewter medalists Carreira/Ponomarenko. When the U.S. team was announced for the 2022 Winter Olympics in Beijing, Wolfkostin/Chen were named third alternates.

Due to the pandemic, the 2022 World Junior Championships could not be held as scheduled in Sofia in early March and, as a result, were rescheduled for Tallinn in mid-April. Due to Vladimir Putin's invasion of Ukraine, the International Skating Union banned all Russian and Belarusian athletes from participating, which had a significant impact on the field of figure skating and ice dance. Wolfkostin/Chen were considered frontrunners for the title, however, following a fall at the beginning of the rhythm dance, they placed ninth in that segment, 6.40 points behind third-place Bashynska/Beaumont of Canada.  Wolfkostin/Chen mounted a comeback in the free dance, placing second in that segment with a score within 0.04 points of their personal best, which raised them to fourth place overall. They finished 0.37 points back of bronze medalists Bashynska/Beaumont.

2022–2023 season 
Despite their disappointing result at the World Junior Championships, it did not alter Wolfkostin and Chen's plans to move up to the senior level for the following season. Chen would later explain their reasoning that "we had already competed a bit in seniors last year, and we were excited to move into seniors. We feel that it's inspiring and helps us grow faster. It also relieves a bit of pressure; being the ones who chase after people, instead of being targeted." In addition, Wolfkostin and Chen announced in May that they would be leaving coach Igor Shpilband to train at the new Michigan Ice Dance Academy in Canton, Michigan, under coaches Greg Zuerlein, Tanith Belbin White, and Olympic champion Charlie White. Wolfkostin said that while it had been a difficult decision, "if we're going to experiment with a different training environment, now's the time." In addition, it aligned with their mutual decision to attend the nearby University of Michigan in Ann Arbor.

The team debuted new senior programs at the 2022 Lake Placid Ice Dance International, where they won the bronze medal. Shortly afterward, they appeared on the Challenger series at the 2022 CS U.S. Classic, finishing sixth.  At their second Challenger, the 2022 CS Budapest Trophy, Wolfkostin/Chen won the bronze medal, setting three new personal bests in the process. In November, they were invited to make their senior Grand Prix debut, finishing in eighth place at the 2022 Grand Prix de France. They were tenth at the 2022 NHK Trophy, struggling with level issues on several elements. Chen later said that illness and a training injury had hindered them during the Grand Prix. At the 2023 U.S. Championships, they placed tenth in the rhythm dance and fifth in the free dance, resulting in a seventh place finish overall.

On February 8, Wolfkostin and Chen announced the end of their partnership.

Programs

With Wolfkostin

Competitive highlights 
JGP: Junior Grand Prix. Pewter medals (4th place) awarded only at U.S. national, sectional, and regional events.

With Wolfkostin

With Lavrova

With Buckley

With Karnes

Men's singles

Detailed results

With Wolfkostin

Senior results

Junior results

References

External links 
 
 Katarina Wolfkostin and Jeffrey Chen at U.S. Figure Skating

2002 births
Living people
American male ice dancers
American dancers of Asian descent
American sportspeople of Taiwanese descent
People from Fremont, California
Figure skaters at the 2020 Winter Youth Olympics
Youth Olympic bronze medalists for the United States